Hans Blüher (17 February 1888 in Freiburg in Schlesien – 4 February 1955 in Berlin) was a German writer and philosopher. He attained prominence as an early member and "first historian" of the Wandervogel movement. He was aided by his taboo breaking rebellion against schools and the Church. He was received with some genuine interest but sometimes perceived as scandalous.

During the transition from the German Empire to the Weimar liberal democracy, Blüher, a radical conservative and monarchist, became a staunch opponent of the Weimar Republic. In 1928, he had the opportunity to meet the former Kaiser Wilhelm II, in exile in the Netherlands. Blüher believed that pederasty and male bonding provided a basis for a stronger nation and state, which became a popular concept within certain segments of the Hitler Youth. Blüher later supported the Nazis but turned on them in 1934, when SA leader Ernst Röhm was murdered on Hitler's orders during the Night of the Long Knives.

Since 1924, Blüher, who had married a doctor and had two children, had worked as a freelance writer and  practicing psychologist in Berlin-Hermsdorf. He worked there, after his retirement from public life during the Nazi period, on his major philosophical work of 1949, Die Achse der Natur.

Student at Gymnasium Steglitz 

In 1896 Blüher's father, the pharmacist Hermann Blüher, his wife Helene and their eight-year-old son Hans, left Freiburg and took up residence first in Halle and then, in 1898, in Steglitz where the ten-year-old Hans was sent to the local Gymnasium. In his 1912 account Blüher wrote:

"The intellectual pleasures are the purest and the most perfect. They persist throughout life undiminished and constantly trigger new feelings of happiness. One should expect that an institution such as a school, which deals only with intellectual subjects, and at the youngest age of life, would almost have to generate a rapture of discovery and understanding: - And it produces just the opposite! The student works not only with occasional overexertion and difficulty, which is naturally unavoidable in even the most liberal of intellectual endeavors, but with an immense feeling of displeasure. And this is expected at an age which, on account of its tenderness and need for joy, is least of all appropriate. On these young shoulders, in fact, lies a burden which the man only thinks back on in horror and yet it is perpetually alive in his dreams. [...]

The "science" learned in schools and the whole conception of culture which is represented there is indeed not free at all but entirely imposed. It is in service to all kinds of ideals and possible prejudices; patriotism and religion necessitate, in order to find solid ground in the student's heart, a quite considerable staining and falsification of reality. [...] Whence shall the intellectual joy come if the instrument is out of tune with the student who could well play upon it...?"
Later Blüher's criticism was, in part, much milder and more grateful. School director, Robert  Lück, who Blüher had described as one of the somewhat narrow-minded Christian educators, underwent a revaluation in Blüher's second version of his autobiographical work "Werke und Tage." Blüher praised Lück's life work and described his selection of faculty as masterful: "How he actually managed it remains a mystery to everyone. He had an obvious charisma. The college nearly resembled an order."
In his autobiography, Blüher set his former school among the ranks of those gymnasiums to which he accorded a prominent role in German cultural life. Nowhere else in Germany was the soil for the dispute between humanistic education and the romantic counter-culture so fruitful; the Wandervogel and the youth movement could only have occurred here.

Wandervogel Movement 

Hans Blüher was admitted to the Wandervogel in 1902 as a 33rd degree member. His initiation was a ceremonial procedure wherein Karl Fischer deterred "foxes" for each of the newcomers. After instruction of the goals and premises of the Wandervogel movement, the aspirant swore loyalty to Fischer and to obey when necessary. He promised this in the presence of at least two other witnesses who attested to the oath then Fischer wrote his name into the members' book.

Hans Blüher understood this community as a protest movement against the "weathered ideals" of the "old generation" which one should vigorously resist with his own views and experiences. Blüher had a strictly dismissive attitude of the pedagogical tendencies and leisurely hiking of the group. For example, provisions that set early rest stops out of consideration for the younger participants were to him proof of "an insufficient understanding of the great experience of horror that the forest and the night also produced in the minds of the older members." There is a weak disregard for the young personality in "breaking the power of such precious hours." Blüher even thought little of recommendations to call off hikes due to persistent rain so as to not negatively affect the clothes and mood of the hikers: "That is exactly what is recommended for the faint of heart who from the very outset admit that they do not have the ability to drown out the inclement weather with the exuberance of their youthfulness. Those who know the old Wandervogel bacchanalia and are no degenerates, also know the unforgettable glory of such rainy weather marches."

Even in his 60s, Blüher spoke praisingly of those regions of Mark Brandenburg in which the Steglitzer Wandervogel found their weekend adventures in nature. This comparatively inconspicuous landscape wanted to be discovered "with the full fervor and suppleness of our hearts: this landscape had to be conquered, its divine word had come to us, otherwise us youth would have perished in the foul breath of the culture of our fathers. [...]The Nuthethal, upon which the first fire of our youth movement blazed, had imbued us with the historical force that had been in it for centuries and we partook of it. We came down from its hills and were a state."

These unusual formations of young people created a peculiar contrast to the rest of the citizenry of Steglitz when they returned home after an extensive hike:

Hans Blüher, whose strikingly gaunt appearance earned him the nickname "Ghost," developed into one of Fischer's most loyal supporters but he also had Fischer's crucial support during his time with the Wandervogel movement.

During a summer trip to the Rhine in 1903, Blüher was sent home by expedition leader Siegfried Copalle for lacking identification, which did not meet with Fischer's approval. As a result, he defended him.
 
Another exceedingly lasting impression on Hans Blüher was made by the wealthy landowner Wilhelm "Willie" Jansen who met Blüher, himself an expedition leader now, on a 1905 summer trip from the Rhön to Lake Constance where Blüher won him for the Wandervogel movement.

Like Karl Fischer before him, Wilhelm Jansen was the idealized youth leader who came to his authority through charisma and talent and not articles or power, as the teachers had alleged. Through the element of voluntarism, the model of the youth leader received an unexpected dynamism, which was generally described as anything from romantically wistful to fascinatingly mysterious. The self-education of the youth also made it possible to break away from the traditions of their parents' generation, which they considered outdated, and test out their own ways of growing up. For Blüher, at least, Jansen was the pioneering personality of the youth movement:

The motif of the naked body, pristinely and truly perceived, is found not only in the youth movement, but also in other life reform groups and schools of thought. In all these cases, reference is made to the noble and truly idealized nudity of ancient cultures.

Historian of the Movement

Hans Blüher, who graduated from high school in 1907, spent seven years in the Wandervogel movement before leaving in 1909. But even then, he did not completely break off ties with the group, particularly as Blüher stood by his early friendships during the split-up of the organization and reclaimed sovereignty of interpretation over the development of the movement at the behest of the movement itself and supported by Willie Jansen, who urged him to pre-empt another party's account of the Wandervogel with a work of his own.

From the very title of the work itself, the 24-year-old Blüher claimed to comprehend and explain the rise, peak, and decline of the movement. It was important to him, he wrote in the foreword, to tie together the seemingly unconnected factors and determine the moving parts of this movement. In contrast to the mere chronicler, every historian must confront this subjective side of his work.

Blüher interpreted the institutional beginning of the Wandervogel movement as a "stroke of genius" on the part of Karl Fischer against school laws and the state authorities, who prohibited students from forming their own associations. By obtaining for a number of respected Steglitz citizens positions as board members on the "Board for School Transportation," he was able to establish the group on a permanent foundation and at the same time set the pattern for further initiatives: "This committee was the actual club. It was presented to the school and the names of the men ensured that everything went well. Quite apart from this was the actual youth movement with its leaders; it was ensured that the committee had as little as possible to do with it, only giving money and names and, as mentioned, 'vouched' for it to the public. The students themselves were entered into the "Student Book," but were not members of the association but rather only on a list where you could find their addresses."

At the inaugural session, Fischer appeared with some of his loyal followers, including the apprentice mechanic Wolf Meyen, who, being the youngest among them, came up with a brilliant idea for the name of their society, as Blüher relates:

Meyen had seen the tomb of Kaethe Branco, née Helmholtz (1850-1877) in the Berlin-Dahlem Cemetery and read its inscription: "Who has given you the wandering birds of science..."

The association was founded in early November 1901; Fischer used the following winter months to recruit further suitable companions, who he could place in leadership roles for the next hiking season.

Initially, Blüher took a smug, dismissive attitude towards ideas that the Wandervogel was a form of "pedagogization." Thus, he polemicized against the "popular patriotic and bourgeois" ideals of their fathers, "such as those one gets to read in the newspaper and with which one applying for a government post can equip himself just so much as to be certain of a good career." This was extremely well suited for publicity:

Eventually, there dawned "a time that bore the stamp of modernity" for Blüher in the history of the Wandervogel movement:

The inclusion of girls in the Wandervogel movement was strictly forbidden by Karl Fischer, who feared a blurring of gender images, presented as polar opposites: a feminization of the boys and a "tomboy-ization" of the girls. The spirit and nature of the boys were exclusively assigned classically masculine attributes such as toughness, a thirst for adventure, discipline, boldness, determination and physical strength. Through their relationship with male leaders, it was important to develop their own individual masculinity, and not only by their separation from women and girls, but also from their own biological fathers, who were seen as unsuitable role models. The Wandervogel movement thus confirmed the prevailing social gender roles and practices of the time which barred boys and girls from being together without adult supervision.

Critic of the Times and Taboo-Breaker: Pederasty

It was not uncommon for Blüher to strike an ironic or polemical tone in his history of the Wandervogel movement where he found that the movement had strayed from its origins or was spiked with the values of "the old generation." He was allergic, for example, to the appeals of older officers who assigned national services and duties. In contrast, it was important for him "to muster up enough laughs to constitute the only effective counterbalance to the patriotism of the war club." As a sign of inner maturity, he proposed "the self-evident respect for the love of other peoples for their fatherlands." In 1912, the personification and idolization of the fatherland through things such as statues of Germania seemed laughable to him and he considered embarrassing the pledge of "loyalty until death" affiliated "with the systematic slaughter of other peoples."

Blüher considered neither patriotic impulses nor a mere recreational purpose - moving away from "book dust" towards the revival of a willingness to learn - as decisive motives for the Wandervogel movement. Rather he saw in it an instinctive desire to turn away from the culture of their fathers in a Romantic return to nature: "A deep moral corruption, a nearly unspeakable insincerity in almost every serious relationship will prevail wherever young people are prepared by an idea rather than by their own selves and real-world situations."

Blüher's most consistent violation of the code of values and taboos of the fathers' generation was his affirmation of male homoeroticism and its influence on the Wandervogel movement. He had learned of the phenomenon itself during school lessons on classical antiquity. Ion of Chios was covered with a passage wherein Sophocles kisses a boy who is serving him at a banquet and falls in love with him: "The students had to translate this passage and thus got to know a side of ancient life that was deliberately concealed from them. They shook their heads and now knew much more than they had. They also likely found their way better in their own lives.”

In his memoirs, Blüher describes the Steglitz Gymnasium of his school days as a place where homoerotic relationships were quite common among the boys:

According to Hergemöller, Blüher himself is said to have attracted attention in these years through a series of homoerotic escapades. A hapless apprentice locksmith who fell in love with him, as Blüher attests, committed suicide because of him. Ulfried Geuter, who evaluated Blüher's private estate for his study, confirms its heterosexual orientation and quotes from a letter from Blüher to his parents, "that it was only a question of will power and chance that tipped the scales in this direction," because he had "bad luck in the inverted direction" for years, which resulted in its waning. His beloved Louise, on the other hand, has had a hardly passionate but nevertheless uniform and powerful effect on him for three and a half years.

The topic of homosexuality assumed greater significance when Willie Jansen, who was serving as federal chairman of the Wandervogel movement in Berlin, denied the allegations against him of unlawful conduct in this regard, but attested to his colleagues naivety and ignorance regarding the homoerotic aspects in the life of the Wandervogel movement and added that they would probably be more cautious in this matter if the gentlemen were better aware of what interested themselves in the youth of the Wandervogel movement. "That was," comments Blüher, "an amazing speech, which was even more impactful since in fact none of the men, old or young, possessed any substantial knowledge of the erotic things." Geuter authenticates Blüher in this correlation by stating his work was "quintessentially a history of inclination, the second volume of which obviously served to pay homage to Jansen."

Blüher considered an observation made by Jansen during a personal conversation as fundamental to his own intellectual life: "Where does the vitality that is capable of giving rise to such a movement of masculine youth come from, if not from men who, instead of loving a wife or becoming the father of a family, loved young men and founded Männerbünde?" Through Jansen, Blüher also became acquainted with the philosopher and zoologist Benedict Friedlaender and was introduced to the "Gemeinschaft der Eigenen" (Community of the Unique), an association of homosexual literati, scientists and artists, founded by him and Adolf Brand. Brand published the magazine Der Eigene (The Unique) from 1896 to 1932, in which he campaigned for the emancipation of homosexuals and for "art and masculine culture." Brunotte identifies Blüher in 1912 as a member of both the Community of the Unique and the Scientific-Humanitarian Committee of Magnus Hirschfeld and sees Blüher's early work as an intersection serving as the bridge between the various concepts of homosexuality and masculinity on the one hand and Freudian psychoanalysis on the other.

To the first two volumes of his account of the Wandervogel movement, which discussed its "Rise," "Peak," and "Decline," Blüher added a third under the title "The German Wandervogel Movement as Erotic Phenomenon." He had already anticipated resistance to the distribution of his writings prior to their publication - school director Lück personally saw to it that Blüher's volumes were removed from display in Steglitz bookstores, which did not noticeably harm demand, and had the publication of all three volumes secured by contract. It was crucial for him "to suddenly ambush public opinion, to suddenly be there completely unexpectedly, and to be there in such a way that you could no longer be driven out from this position."

See also 

Heinrich Schurtz
Adolf Brand
Homosexuality and Male Bonding in Pre-Nazi Germany, by Hubert Kennedy
Male Fantasies, by Klaus Theweleit
The Hidden Hitler, by Lothar Machtan
Homosociality

References

External links 

1888 births
1955 deaths
German Youth Movement
German LGBT writers
Masculists
People from Steglitz-Zehlendorf
20th-century German philosophers